Santa María del Mar may refer to:

Santa María del Mar (Castrillón), a civil parish of Castrillón, Asturias, Spain
Santa Maria del Mar, Barcelona, a church in Barcelona, Spain
Santa María del Mar, Havana, a beach east of Havana, Cuba
Santa María del Mar District (Peru), in Lima, Peru
Santa María del Mar, a community in Juchitán de Zaragoza, Oaxaca, Mexico